Bobykino is a village) in Orlovskoye Rural Settlement, Velikoustyugsky District, Vologda Oblast, Russia. The population was 5 as of 2002.

Geography 
Bobykino is located 70 km southeast of Veliky Ustyug (the district's administrative centre) by road. Pleso is the nearest rural locality.

References 

Rural localities in Velikoustyugsky District